Pterocyclos is a genus of tropical land snails in the subfamily Cyclophorinae of the family Cyclophoridae.

Species

 Pterocyclos aborensis Godwin-Austen, 1915
 Pterocyclos albersi L. Pfeiffer, 1847
 Pterocyclos amabilis Fulton, 1905
 Pterocyclos anamullayensis Sutcharit & Panha, 2019
 Pterocyclos anguliferus (Souleyet, 1841)
 Pterocyclos aspersus Bullen, 1906
 Pterocyclos ater Stoliczka, 1871
 Pterocyclos aureus (Heude, 1885)
 Pterocyclos baruensis H. Rolle, 1908
 Pterocyclos berthae Dautzenberg & Hamonville, 1887
 Pterocyclos bifrons L. Pfeiffer, 1855
 Pterocyclos bilabiatus Benson, 1835
 Pterocyclos blandi Benson, 1851
 Pterocyclos brahmakundensis Godwin-Austen, 1915
 Pterocyclos celebensis (E. A. Smith, 1896)
 Pterocyclos cetra Benson, 1856
 Pterocyclos cingalensis Benson, 1853
 Pterocyclos comatus Beddome, 1881
 Pterocyclos cucullus Godwin-Austen, 1889
 Pterocyclos cumingi L. Pfeiffer, 1851
 Pterocyclos cyclophoroideus G. Nevill, 1881
 Pterocyclos diluvium Sutcharit & Panha, 2014
 Pterocyclos eudaedaleus Crosse, 1869
 Pterocyclos feddeni W. T. Blanford, 1865
 Pterocyclos foveolatus E. von Martens, 1908
 Pterocyclos franzhuberi Thach, 2017
 Pterocyclos frednaggsi Sutcharit & Panha, 2014
 Pterocyclos friedae Thach & F. Huber, 2016
 Pterocyclos heinrichhuberi Thach & F. Huber, 2020
 Pterocyclos huberi Thach, 2015
 Pterocyclos insignis Theobald, 1865
 Pterocyclos kintanum (de Morgan, 1885)
 Pterocyclos kobelti Clench & Archer, 1932
 Pterocyclos latilabrum E. A. Smith, 1895
 Pterocyclos magnus Godwin-Austen, 1876
 Pterocyclos marionae Preston, 1914
 Pterocyclos miriensis Godwin-Austen, 1915
 Pterocyclos moellendorffi Kobelt, 1909
 Pterocyclos moluccensis Kobelt, 1897
 Pterocyclos nanus Benson, 1851
 Pterocyclos niahensis Godwin-Austen, 1889
 Pterocyclos perrieri Morlet, 1889
 Pterocyclos prestoni Bavay & Dautzenberg, 1909
 Pterocyclos pseudocumingi Möllendorff, 1897
 Pterocyclos pullatus Benson, 1856
 Pterocyclos puriensis (G. Nevill, 1878)
 Pterocyclos rupestris Benson, 1832
 Pterocyclos schileykoi Thach & F. Huber, 2017
 Pterocyclos schmackeri Möllendorff, 1897
 Pterocyclos sluiteri O. Boettger, 1890
 Pterocyclos spelaeotes (Tomlin, 1931)
 Pterocyclos spiramentum Godwin-Austen, 1915
 Pterocyclos spiroliratus Djajasasmita, 1988
 Pterocyclos subalatus Sykes, 1903
 Pterocyclos subulatus Benson, 1903
 Pterocyclos tenuilabiatus (Metcalfe, 1852)
 Pterocyclos thachi F. Huber, 2017
 Pterocyclos troscheli Benson, 1851
 Pterocyclos umbraticus (van Benthem Jutting, 1949)

Taxa inquirenda
 Pterocyclos liuanus Gredler, 1885 
 Pterocyclos microchilus Crosse, 1868 
Synonyms
 Pterocyclos (Spiraculum) Pearson, 1833: synonym of Spiraculum Pearson, 1833 (unaccepted rank)
 Pterocyclos (Spiraculum) mastersi (W. T. Blanford, 1877): synonym of Spiraculum mastersi W. T. Blanford, 1877 (unaccepted combination)
 Pterocyclos (Spiraculum) mastersi Blanford, 1877: synonym of Spiraculum mastersi W. T. Blanford, 1877
 Pterocyclos albersi L. Pfeiffer, 1847: synonym of Crossopoma albersi (L. Pfeiffer, 1847) (original combination)
 Pterocyclos bathyschisma Möllendorff, 1898: synonym of Ptychopoma bathyschisma (Möllendorff, 1898) (original combination)
 Pterocyclos biciliatum Mousson, 1849: synonym of Opisthoporus biciliatus (Mousson, 1849) (original combination)
 Pterocyclos cambodjensis Morelet, 1875: synonym of Rhiostoma cambodjense (Morelet, 1875) (original combination)
 Pterocyclos chinensis Möllendorff, 1874: synonym of Ptychopoma chinense (Möllendorff, 1874) (original combination)
 Pterocyclos cycloteus Gredler, 1885: synonym of Ptychopoma cycloteum (Gredler, 1885) (original combination)
 Pterocyclos danieli Morlet, 1886: synonym of Cyclotus danieli (Morlet, 1886) (junior synonym)
 Pterocyclos gerlachi Möllendorff, 1882: synonym of Pterocyclus gerlachi Möllendorff, 1882 (incorrect spelling of genus name)
 Pterocyclos hainanensis H. Adams, 1870: synonym of Cyclotus hainanensis (H. Adams, 1870) (original combination)
 Pterocyclos hensanensis Gredler, 1886: synonym of Ptychopoma lienense hensanense (Gredler, 1886) (original combination and rank)
 Pterocyclos hispidus (Pearson, 1833): synonym of Spiraculum hispidum Pearson, 1833 (unaccepted combination)
 Pterocyclos incomptus (G. B. Sowerby I, 1850): synonym of Incidostoma incomptum (G. B. Sowerby I, 1850) (superseded combination)
 Pterocyclos labuanensis L. Pfeiffer, 1864: synonym of Cyclotus labuanensis (L. Pfeiffer, 1864) (original combination)
 Pterocyclos lienensis Gredler, 1882: synonym of Ptychopoma lienense lienense (Gredler, 1882) (original combination)
 Pterocyclos liuanum Gredler, 1885: synonym of Ptychopoma lienense liuanum (Gredler, 1885) (original combination and rank)
 Pterocyclos lowianus L. Pfeiffer, 1864: synonym of Cyclotus lowianus (L. Pfeiffer, 1864) (original combination)
 Pterocyclos marioni Ancey, 1898: synonym of Rhiostoma marioni (Ancey, 1898) (original combination)
 Pterocyclos mindaiensis Bock, 1881: synonym of Cyclotus mindaiensis (Bock, 1881) (original combination)
 Pterocyclos parva Pease, 1865: synonym of Garrettia parva (Pease, 1865) (original combination)
 Pterocyclos parvus (Pearson, 1833): synonym of Spiraculum parvum Pearson, 1833 (unaccepted combination)
 Pterocyclos regelspergeri (de Morgan, 1885): synonym of Spiraculum regelspergeri (de Morgan, 1885)
 Pterocyclos spaleotes (Tomlin, 1931): synonym of Pterocyclos spelaeotes (Tomlin, 1931) (incorrect subsequent spelling)
 Pterocyclos sumatranus E. von Martens, 1864: synonym of Cyclotus sumatranus (E. von Martens, 1864) (original combination)
 Pterocyclos tener Menke, 1857: synonym of Cyclotus tener (Menke, 1856) (original combination)
 Pterocyclos tristis Blanford, 1869: synonym of Theobaldius tristis (Blanford, 1869)
 Pterocyclos vanbuensis E. A. Smith, 1896: synonym of Scabrina vanbuensis (E. A. Smith, 1896) (original combination)
 Pterocyclos wilsoni L. Pfeiffer, 1866: synonym of Ptychopoma wilsoni (L. Pfeiffer, 1866) (original combination)

References

External links
 Benson, W. H. (1832). Account of a new genus of land snails, allied to the genus Cyclostoma, of Lamarck; with a description of a species found on the outlying rocks of the Rajmahal range of Hills. The Journal of the Asiatic Society of Bengal. 1: 11-14, pl. 1
 Fischer P. (1880-1887). Manuel de Conchyliologie et de Paléontologie Conchyliologique. Paris, Savy pp. XXIV + 1369 + pl. 23.
  Troschel, F. H. (1837). Steganotoma nov. gen. Archiv für Naturgeschichte. 3(1): 163-165, pl. 3, figs 12-13.
 Adams, A. (1861). On the animal of Alycaeus and some other cyclophoroid genera. Annals and Magazine of Natural History. (3) 7 (39): 196-197
  Reeve, L. A. (1863). Monograph of the genus Pterocyclos. In: Conchologia Iconica, or, illustrations of the shells of molluscous animals, vol. 14, pls. 1-5 and unpaginated text. L. Reeve & Co., London

 

Cyclophoridae
Gastropod genera